"Thank God for the Rain" / "You Never Will Be" is a double A-side single by Graham Coxon, from his third solo album Crow Sit on Blood Tree. It was released as a very limited 7" and CD (only 1500 copies) on 30 July 2001. It reached number 92 on the UK Singles Chart.

Track listing
7" TRAN011
 "Thank God for the Rain"
 "You Never Will Be"
CD TRANCD011
 "Thank God for the Rain"
 "You Never Will Be"

References

External links
Official discography link

2001 singles
Graham Coxon songs
2001 songs